Prairieton Township may refer to the following townships in the United States:

 Prairieton Township, Christian County, Illinois
 Prairieton Township, Vigo County, Indiana